Walter Bert Chilsen (June 22, 1885 – July 2, 1982) was an American newspaper editor and politician.

Biography
Chilsen was born in Merrill, Wisconsin and was educated in the public schools. He worked in the railroad construction business as a commissary clerk and in the mercantile business. Chilsen also worked as a rural mail carrier. Chilsen was also in the printing business and was one of the editors of the Merrill Daily Herald. Chilsen served on the Merrill City Council and on the Lincoln County Board. Chilsen was a Republican. Chilsen served in the Wisconsin State Assembly in 1919 and 1920. He ran for the United States House of Representative in 1928 and for the United States Senate seat in 1940 on the Republican ticket and lost both elections. Chilsen died at Holy Cross Hospital in Merrill, Wisconsin. His son was Walter Chilsen who also served in the Wisconsin Legislature.

Notes

External links

1885 births
1982 deaths
People from Merrill, Wisconsin
Editors of Wisconsin newspapers
Mail carriers
Businesspeople from Wisconsin
County supervisors in Wisconsin
Wisconsin city council members
Republican Party members of the Wisconsin State Assembly
20th-century American politicians
20th-century American businesspeople